Szymon Kuźma (born 5 September 1997) is a Polish professional footballer who plays as midfielder for Świt Nowy Dwór Mazowiecki.

References

External links

1997 births
People from Krynica-Zdrój
Sportspeople from Lesser Poland Voivodeship
Living people
Polish footballers
Poland youth international footballers
Association football midfielders
Sandecja Nowy Sącz players
Miedź Legnica players
Świt Nowy Dwór Mazowiecki players
I liga players
III liga players